The Robinson-Lewis-G. F. Fessenden House is a historic house in Arlington, Massachusetts.  The -story wood-frame house was built c. 1850, and is a well-preserved Italianate style house, with ornate bracketed window surrounds, and a gable-roofed front porch with dentil moulding and full pediment.  It was built as a farmhouse in an area that was not developed as a residential subdivision until later in the 19th century, and only had a few houses prior to that development.

The house was listed on the National Register of Historic Places in 1985.

See also
National Register of Historic Places listings in Arlington, Massachusetts

References

Houses on the National Register of Historic Places in Arlington, Massachusetts
Houses in Arlington, Massachusetts